The Canon EOS D6000 was Kodak's Canon-based digital SLR camera (a rebranded Kodak DCS 560) that was released in 1998.

See also
Kodak DCS

External links
 Canon Camera Museum: EOS D6000

D6000